The European Union of Medical Specialists (UEMS: Union Européenne des Médecins Spécialistes) is a professional organisation of doctors representing medical specialists in the European Union, which was founded in 1958. It is the oldest medical organization in Europe, and represents about 1.6 million medical specialists.. It promotes high levels of medical training and practice, to improve and guarantee the highest level of patientcare.

With a current membership from 41 countries, it is the representative organisation of the National Associations of Medical Specialists in the European Union and its associated countries.

More than fifty medical disciplines and competences are represented within the organization. Among them, there are 43 Specialist Sections which represent full medical specialties recognized in all European countries. Together with European Scientific Societies, they created European Boards with the aim to define European standards of medical education of training, through the creation of European Training Requirements and European Examinations. Sections also contribute to the work of Multidisciplinary Joint Committees which address fields of multidisciplinary nature.

The European Union of Medical Specialists is responsible for accreditation of Continuing Medical Education through the EACCME®.

European CME accreditation: EACCME® 
European accreditation through UEMS-EACCME® means that a CME activity, event, programme or e-learning material has fulfilled the UEMS-EACCME® quality requirements. Accreditation will only be provided if the CME activity or material has a high quality scientific content and an appropriate educational approach, and if it is a free of commercial bias.

EACCME® credits are recognized by National Accreditation Authorities in Europe as well as in other non-EU countries.

In addition to European countries, EACCME® accreditation has agreements of mutual recognition with the United States and Canada.

List of members

Full members 

 Austria: Austrian Medical Association / Österreichische Arztekammer
 Belgium: Groupement des Unions Professionnelles Belges de Médecins Spécialistes – Verbond der Belgische Beroepsverenigingen van Geneescheren Specialisten (GBS-VBS)
 Bulgaria : Bulgarian Medical Association
 Croatia: Croatian Medical Association
 Cyprus: Cyprus Medical Association
 Czech Republic: Czech Medical Association J.E. Purkyne
 Denmark: Danish Medical Association / Den Almindelige Danske Laegeforening
 Estonia: Estonian Medical Association / Eesti Arstide Liit
 Finland: Finnish Medical Association / Suomen Laakarilitto
 France: Union Nationale des Médecins Spécialistes Confédérés (UMESPE)
 Germany : Spitzenverband Fachärzte Deutschlands e.V. (SpiFa)
 Greece: Panhellenic Medical Association
 Hungary: Association of Hungarian Medical Societies (MOTESZ)
 Iceland: Icelandic Medical Association / Laeknafelag Islands
 Ireland: Irish Medical Association
 Italy: Federazione Nazionale degli Ordini dei Medici Chirurghi e degli Odontoiatri (FNOMCeO)
 Latvia : Latvian Medical Association
 Lithuania : Lithuanian Medical Association
 Luxembourg : Association des Médecins et Médecins Dentistes
 Malta : Medical Association of Malta
 Netherlands: Federatie Medisch Specialisten
 Norway: Norwegian Medical Association / den Norske Legeforening
 Poland: Polish Chamber of Physicians and Dentists
 Portugal: Portuguese Medical Association / Ordem dos Medicos
 Romania: Romanian College of Physicians, Romanian Medical Association
 Slovakia: Slovak Medical Association
 Slovenia: Medical Chamber of Slovenia
 Spain: General Medical Council of Spain / Consejo General de Colegios Medicos
 Sweden: Swedish Medical Association
 Switzerland: Swiss Medical Association
 United Kingdom: British Medical Association

Associate members 

 Armenia: Armenian Medical Association
 Israel: Israeli Medical Association
 Serbia: Serbian Medical Chamber
 Turkey: Turkish Medical Association
Ukraine: Ukrainian Medical Association

Observers 

 Georgia: Georgian Association of Medical Specialists
 Iraq: the Arab Board of Health Specialisations in Iraq
 Lebanon: Lebanese Order of Physicians
 Morocco: Collège Syndical National des Médecins
 Tunisia : Ordre des Médecins de Tunisie

List of medical specialties represented 
The UEMS represents more than 50 medical disciplines through various bodies and structures. The most important ones are the 43 Specialist Sections, which represent independently recognised specialties. They have created a European Board as a subgroup, in conjunction with the relevant European Society, with a view to defining European standards of medical education and training. They also contribute to the work of Multidisciplinary Joint Committees (MJC) which address fields of a multidisciplinary nature.

UEMS Specialist Sections and Boards 

 Allergology
 Anaesthesiology
 Cardiology 
 Cardiothoracic Surgery
 Child and Adolescent Psychiatry
 Clinical Neurophysiology
 Dermatology and Venereology
 Emergency Medicine
 Endocrinology
 Gastroenterology
 Geriatrics
 Gynaecology and Obstetrics 
 Infectious Diseases
 Internal Medicine
 Laboratory Medicine / Medical Biopathology
 Medical Genetics
 Medical Microbiology
 Medical Oncology
 Nephrology
 Neurology
 Neurosurgery
 Nuclear Medicine
 Occupational Medicine
 Ophthalmology
 Oro-Maxillo-Facial Surgery
 Orthopaedics &  Traumatology
 Otorhinolaryngology
 Paediatric Surgery
 Paediatrics
 Pathology
 Pharmacology
 Physical and Rehabilitation Medicine
 Plastic, Reconstructive and Aesthetic Surgery
 Pneumology
 Psychiatry
 Public Health Medicine
 Radiology
 Radiation Oncology and Radiotherapy
 Rheumatology
 Surgery
 Thoracic Surgery
 Urology
 Vascular Surgery

Multidisciplinary Joint Committee 

 Adolescent Medicine
 Breast Care
 Hand Surgery
 Immune Mediated Disease
 Infection Control
 Intensive Care Medicine
 Manual Medicine
 Network of Accredited Skills Centers in Europe (NASCE)
 Oncology
 Pain Medicine
 Paediatric Urology
 Phlebology
 Rare & Undiagnosed Diseases
 Sexual Medicine
 Spine Surgery
 Sports Medicine
 Wound Healing

Thematic Federations 

 Council for European Specialist Medical Assessment (CESMA)
 Hypertension
 Legal and Forensic Medicine
 Vertigo

Specialist Divisions 

 Angiology (Internal Medicine)
 Breast Surgery (Surgery)
 Coloproctology (Surgery)
 Emergency Surgery (Surgery)
 Endocrine Surgery (Surgery)
 General Surgery (Surgery)
 Hepato-Pancreato-Biliary Surgery (Surgery)
 Interventional Radiology (Radiology).
 Neuroradiology (Radiology)
 Oesophagogastric Surgery (Surgery)
 Reproductive Medicine (Gynaecology)
 Surgical Oncology (Surgery)
 Transplant Coordination (Surgery)
 Transplant Immunology (Surgery)
 Transplant Medicine (Surgery)
 Transplant Surgery (Surgery)
 Trauma Surgery (Surgery)

List of UEMS activities

EU Affairs 

 Involvement in the Directive 2005/26/EC on Professional Qualifications and its following updates. This directive’s aim was to coordinate the system of mutual recognition of professional qualification in EU/EEA countries, including medical specialists, to facilitate professional mobility.
 Involvement in the EU Commission’s Joint Action on Healthcare Workforce. Its purpose it to sustain cross-country cooperation and provide support to Member States to increase their knowledge and achieve a higher effectiveness in health workforce planning and policy.
 Involvement in the European Reference Networks which are virtual networks involving healthcare providers across Europe. The aim is to facilitate discussion on complex or rare diseases and conditions that require highly specialised treatment and concentrated knowledge and resources.
 The UEMS collaborates with the Commission on the following topics as well: e-Health, Health Technology Assessment (HTA).

Accreditation and Postgraduate Training 

 Accreditation of more than 2000 Live Educational Events and more than a hundred E-learning materials each year.
 More than 40 European Training Requirements (ETRs) setting the highest standards in specialty medical training. They are used as a reference in several countries.
 More than 30 European Examinations organised each year and their quality control through appraisals by the UEMS Council for European Specialist Medical Assessment (CESMA)
 8 Medical Training Centers accredited by the UEMS Network of Accredited Skills Centers in Europe (NASCE).

References

Sources

Health and the European Union
Health care industry trade groups
International medical associations of Europe